The law of holes or the first law of holes, is an adage which states: "if you find yourself in a hole, stop digging." It is used as a metaphor, warning that when in an untenable position, it is best to stop making the situation worse.

Background
When it is said, "if you find yourself in a hole, stop digging," it is because digging a hole makes it deeper and therefore harder to get out of. More generally, the adage advises how one should solve problems of their own making.

The second law of holes is commonly known as: "when you stop digging, you are still in a hole."

Attribution
The adage has been attributed to a number of sources. It appeared in print on page six of The Washington Post dated 25 October 1911, in the form: "Nor would a wise man, seeing that he was in a hole, go to work and blindly dig it deeper..."

In 1983, Bill Brock was quoted "Let me tell you about the law of holes: If you find yourself in a hole, stop digging."

In the United Kingdom, it has been referred to as "Healey's first law of holes" after politician Denis Healey, who used the adage in the 1980s and later.

See also
 Escalation of commitment
 Gresham's law
 Sunk cost fallacy

References

1910s neologisms
20th-century philosophy
Adages